Evangelical Methodist Church in Bolivia was founded by American Methodist missionaries in 1906. The work progressed and in 1969 it became autonomous. 

The denomination has 9,000 members and 188 congregations in 2006.

References

External links
Official website

Methodism in Bolivia
Christian organizations established in 1906
1906 establishments in Bolivia
Methodist denominations